Franchetia is a genus of beetles in the family Buprestidae, containing the following species:

 Franchetia carrioni (Cobos, 1960)
 Franchetia curta (Thery, 1954)
 Franchetia grossei (Obenberger, 1937)
 Franchetia marshalli (Thery, 1954)
 Franchetia monardi (Thery, 1947)
 Franchetia montivaga (Thery, 1954)
 Franchetia notata (Thery, 1954)
 Franchetia obesula (Cobos, 1953)
 Franchetia turneri (Thery, 1954)
 Franchetia viedmani (Cobos, 1960)
 Franchetia wittei (Thery, 1948)

References

Buprestidae genera